is a Japanese actress. She was born in Otaru, Hokkaidō, and raised in Nagoya. She was married to director Juzo Itami from 1969 until his death in 1997, and regularly starred in his films.

She has been nominated for eight Best Actress Japanese Academy Awards, winning in 1988 for her role in A Taxing Woman.

Selected filmography

Film
Lost Sex (1966)
The Funeral (1984)
Tampopo (1985)
A Taxing Woman (1987)
A Taxing Woman's Return (1988)
Sweet Home (1989) as Akiko Hayakawa
A-Ge-Man: Tales of a Golden Geisha (1990)
Minbo (1992)
Daibyonin (1993)
Supermarket Woman (1996)
Woman in Witness Protection (1997)
Welcome Back, Mr. McDonald (1997)
Hankyu Railways: A 15-Minute Miracle (2011) as Tokie Hagiwara
Strawberry Song (2019)
Stand by Me Doraemon 2 (2020)
It's a Flickering Life (2021) as Yoshiko
BL Metamorphosis (2022) as Yuki Ichinoi
Haw (2022)

Television
Uchi no Ko ni Kagitte... (1984)
Mōri Motonari (1997), Tae
Manten (2002–03)
Tenchijin (2009), narrator
Amachan (2013)
Botchan (2016)
Hiyokko (2017), Suzuko
In This Corner of the World (2018), Ito Morita
Hiyokko 2 (2019), Suzuko
House of Ninjas (2024), Taki Tawara

Honours 
Medal with Purple Ribbon (2014)
Kinuyo Tanaka Award (2022)
Order of the Rising Sun, 4th Class, Gold Rays with Rosette (2022)

References

External links

Nobuko Miyamoto's JMDb Listing (in Japanese)

1945 births
Living people
20th-century Japanese actresses
21st-century Japanese actresses
Japanese film actresses
Japanese television actresses
People from Otaru
People from Nagoya
Recipients of the Medal with Purple Ribbon
Recipients of the Order of the Rising Sun, 4th class